The Sony Reader  was a line of e-book readers manufactured by Sony, who produced the first commercial E Ink e-reader with the Sony Librie in 2004. It used an electronic paper display developed by E Ink Corporation, was viewable in direct sunlight, required no power to maintain a static image, and was usable in portrait or landscape orientation.

Sony sold e-books for the Reader from the Sony eBook Library in the US, UK, Japan, Germany, Austria, Canada, France, Italy, and Spain. The Reader also could display Adobe PDFs, ePub format, RSS newsfeeds, JPEGs, and Sony's proprietary BBeB ("BroadBand eBook") format. Some Readers could play MP3 and unencrypted AAC audio files.

Compatibility with Adobe digital rights management (DRM) protected PDF and ePub files allowed Sony Reader owners to borrow ebooks from lending libraries in many countries.

The DRM rules of the Reader allowed any purchased e-book to be read on up to six devices, at least one of which must be a personal computer running Windows or Mac OS X. Although the owner could not share purchased eBooks on others' devices and accounts, the ability to register five Readers to a single account and share books accordingly was a possible workaround.

On August 1, 2014, Sony announced that it would not make another consumer e-reader.

In late 2014, Sony released the Sony Digital Paper DPTS1 - which only views PDFs and has a stylus for making notes - aimed at professional business users.

Models and availability
Ten models were produced. The PRS-500 (PRS standing for Portable Reader System) was made available in the United States in September 2006. On 1 November 2006, Readers went on display and for sale at Borders bookstores throughout the US. Borders had an exclusive contract for the Reader until the end of 2006.  From April 2007, Sony Reader has been sold in the US by multiple merchants, including Fry's Electronics, Costco, Borders and Best Buy. The eBook Store from Sony is only available to US or Canadian residents or to customers who purchased a US-model reader with bundled eBook Store credit.

On July 24, 2007, Sony announced that the PRS-505 Reader would be available in the UK with a launch date of September 3, 2008. Waterstone's is the official retail partner and the Reader is available at selected stores such as Argos, Sony Centres and Dixons; while a red edition is available exclusively from John Lewis.

On October 2, 2008 the PRS-700, with touch screen and built-in lighting was announced.

On August 5, 2009 Sony announced two new readers, the budget PRS-300 Pocket Edition and the more advanced PRS-600 Touch Edition.

On August 25, 2009 Sony announced the Reader PRS-900 "Daily Edition."  This features a 7" diagonal screen to compete with the Amazon Kindle DX. It was also the first to feature free 3G wireless through AT&T to access the Sony eBookstore without the need of a computer, and to increase the grayscale level, from 8 to 16.

On September 1, 2010, Sony introduced the PRS-350 Pocket Edition, PRS-650 Touch Edition, PRS-950 "Daily Edition" as replacements for the PRS-300, PRS-600 and PRS-900, with both new models featuring 16-level grey scale touch screens. The launch of the new models also represented the introduction of the Sony Reader into the Australian and New Zealand markets for the first time.

On August 31, 2011, Sony announced a new reader replacing all of their previous models, the PRS-T1, featuring a 6" screen.

On August 16, 2012, Sony announced the PRS-T1 successor, the PRS-T2.

On September 4, 2013, Sony announced the PRS-T2 successor, the PRS-T3. Unlike previous Sony reader models, the T3 is not sold in the US, and Sony has abandoned the North American market due to competition from Amazon, B&N and Kobo.

On February 6, 2014, Sony announced that it was closing its North American, Europe, and Australia Reader Stores in late March, migrating all its customers to the Kobo Reader Store.

On August 1, 2014, Sony announced that it would not release another ereader but would keep selling its remaining stock.

2013 Model (Discontinued in August 2014)

Reader Wi-Fi PRS-T3S 
The PRS-T3S is the latest 6", Wi-Fi only model.
Announced in October 2013 in Japan, it is a PRS-T3 without a cover that costs $99 and was sold in Japan, the UK, Canada and Germany.

Reader Wi-Fi PRS-T3 
The PRS-T3 is a 6", Wi-Fi only model with a snap cover.

Specifications
 Size: 160 × 109 × 11.3 mm
 Weight: 200 grams including snap cover
 Display:
 size: 15.2 cm (6 in) diagonal (approx  area of letter-sized page).
 resolution: 16-level gray scale
 6" Pearl HD E Ink screen 1024 x 758 pixel resolution
 Memory: 2 GiB of internal storage (1.3 GiB available to use) plus microSD expansion of up to 32 GB
 Battery Life: 6–8 weeks, assuming 30 minutes reading per day
 Connectivity: Micro-USB
 PC interface: USB port
 Supported e-book formats: EPUB, PDF, FB2, TXT
 Supported picture formats: BMP, GIF, JPEG, PNG
 Wireless: Wi-Fi 802.11 b, g, n, simple Web browser
 Colors: Black (Matte), Red (Glossy) and White (Glossy)

2012 Model (Discontinued late 2013)

Reader Wi-Fi PRS-T2

The PRS-T2 is a 6" Wi-Fi only model. Its touchscreen supports zoom in and out, dictionary and adding notes, including export to Evernote. The device has two English languages and four translation dictionaries built-in.

PRS-T2 specifications.
 Size: 173 × 110 × 9.1 mm
 Weight: 164 g
 Display:
 size: 15.2 cm (6 in) diagonal (approx 1/4 area of letter-sized page)
 resolution: 16-level gray scale E Ink Pearl display
 portrait: 90.6 × 122.4 mm (3.57" × 4.82"), 600 × 800 pixels | effective 115.4 × 88.2 mm (4.54 × 3.47 in), 754 × 584 pixels
 minimum font size: 6 pt legible, 7 pt recommended
 Memory: 2 GB of internal storage (1.3 GB available to use) plus microSD expansion of up to 32 GB
 Battery Life: Up to 2 months with Wi-Fi off
 Lithium-ion battery: up to two months battery life, with wireless off (on reading 1/2h per day).
 Connectivity: Micro-USB
 PC interface: USB port
 Supported e-book formats: EPUB, PDF, TXT, BBeB*, Rtf*, Doc* (*After conversion with Sony software)
 Supported picture formats: Jpg, Gif, Png, Bmp.
 Wireless: Wi-Fi, simple web browser.
 Colors: Black (Matte), Red (Glossy) and White (Glossy).

2011 Model (Discontinued late 2012)

Reader Wi-Fi PRS-T1

The PRS-T1 is a 6", Wi-Fi only model. Its touchscreen supports zoom in and out, look up in dictionary and adding notes. Up to 16 different languages are supported.

PRS-T1 specifications
 Size: 173 x 110 x 8.9 mm
 Weight: 168 g
 Display:
 size: 15.5 cm (6 in) diagonal (approx  area of letter-sized page)
 resolution: 16-level gray scale E Ink Pearl display
 portrait: 90.6 x 122.4 mm (3.57" x 4.82"), 600 x 800 pixels | effective 88.2 x 115.4 mm (3.47" x 4.54"), 584 x 754 pixels
 minimum font size: 6 pt legible, 7 pt recommended
 Memory: 2 GB of internal storage (1.4 GB available to use) plus microSD expansion of up to 32 GB.
 Lithium-ion battery, up to one month per charge.
 PC interface: USB port
 Supported e-book formats: EPUB, PDF, TXT.
 Supported audio formats: MP3, AAC.
 Wireless: Wi-Fi, simple web browser.
 Colors: Black, Red and White.

2010 Models (Discontinued late 2011)

Pocket Edition PRS-350 

The PRS-350 was launched in August 2010 and it is also known as the "Pocket Edition". The PRS-350 was announced at the same time as the touch-screen PRS-650. It is Sony's smallest ereader as well as its entry-level device replacing the PRS-300 and it is priced at US$179. It has a touch screen, and two GB of Memory but lacks an SD Card Slot and does not support MP3 playback.

PRS-350 specifications

 Size: 145 × 104.3 × 8.5mm
 Weight: 155 g
 Display: 5 inch. E Ink Pearl, touch-screen, grey scale 16-levels
 Resolution 600 × 800 pixels
 Document Search Capability
 Built in flash memory: 2 GB
 Font Size: 6 sizes (XS - XXL)
 Supported e-book formats: EPUB, PDF, Microsoft Word, TXT, RTF, BBeB
 Hi-speed micro USB
 Color: Pink, Silver, Blue, Red, Black

Touch Edition PRS-650 

The PRS-650 was launched in August 2010 and it is also known as the "Touch Edition". The PRS-650 was announced at the same time as the touch-screen PRS-350. It is Sony's mid-range device, priced at US$229. As the replacement for the PRS-600 model, it is Sony's higher-scale, touch-screen edition of the reader. It has a similar interface to the PRS-350.

PRS-650 specifications

 Size: 168 × 118.8 × 9.6mm
 Weight: 215 g
 Display: 6 inch. E Ink Pearl, touch-screen, grey scale 16-levels
 Resolution 600 × 800 pixels
 Document Search Capability
 Built in flash memory: 2 GB
 SD card slot
 Memory Stick PRO Duo slot
 Font Size: 6 sizes (XS - XXL)
 Supported e-book formats: EPUB, PDF, Microsoft Word, TXT, RTF, BBeB
 Supported audio formats: MP3, AAC
 Available case colors:
 PRS-650BC: Black
 PRS-650SC: Silver
 PRS-650RC: Red

Daily Edition PRS-950 

The PRS-950 was launched in August 2010 replacing the PRS-900 and it is also known as the "Daily Edition". It was introduced as Sony's top-of-the-line device, priced at US$299. The device has a larger display (7"), 16-levels of grayscale, touch screen Wi-Fi and 3G wireless access (through AT&T Mobility in a manner similar to the Kindle's whispernet) which enables computer-free access to the Sony eBookstore in the United States. Like earlier Sony Readers the display can be oriented horizontally, enabling a landscape style mode, and adds a new mode displaying two portrait-mode pages side-by-side (in a similar fashion to viewing a book).

PRS-950 specifications

 Size: 199.9 × 128 × 9.6mm
 Weight: 272 g
 Display: 7 inch. E Ink Pearl, touch-screen, grey scale 16-levels
 Resolution 600 × 1024 pixels
 Document Search Capability
 Built in flash memory: 2 GB
 SD card slot
 Memory Stick PRO Duo slot
 Font Size: 6 sizes (XS - XXL)
 Supported e-book formats: EPUB, PDF, Microsoft Word, TXT, RTF, BBeB
 Supported audio formats: MP3, AAC
 Color: Silver only
 Wireless: 3G, Wi-Fi, Web Browser

2009 Models (Discontinued late 2010)

Pocket Edition PRS-300
The PRS-300 was launched in August 2009 and it is also known as the "Pocket Edition".  The PRS-300 was announced at the same time as the touch-screen PRS-600.  It is Sony's smallest ever ereader as well as its entry-level device, priced at US$199.  It has a smaller screen than the PRS-600, no touch interface, no MP3 audio or expandable memory. It has a similar interface to the PRS-500 and PRS-505.

Specifications
 Display: 5 inch.
 Resolution: 600 × 800 pixels
 Dimensions LxWxD (approx.): 6 × 4 × 13/32 inches (approx. 159×108×10 mm)
 Weight (approx.): 220 g (7.76 oz)
 Gray scale: 8-levels gray scale
 Internal Memory: 512MiB, 440MiB accessible
 Font Size: 3 adjustable font sizes
 Battery: Sealed internal, up to two weeks of reading on a single charge
 MSRP: US$150
 Available case colors:
 PRS-300BC: Navy Blue
 PRS-300RC: Rose Pink
 PRS-300SC: Silver

Touch Edition PRS-600

The PRS-600 was launched in August 2009 and it is also known as the "Touch Edition". The PRS-600 was announced at the same time as the non-touch-screen PRS-300. It is Sony's middle-Range device and it priced at US$299. It is the replacement for the PRS-700 model (although it is missing the front-light feature). It is Sony's higher-scale, touch-screen edition of the ereader. It has a similar interface to the PRS-700. Unlike the PRS-700 which was only available in black, the PRS-600 is available in three colors. Note if the device is locked, using the optional 4 digit pin it will not mount via USB, the lock option needs to be disabled in order to mount the device.

This edition has been criticized for having a very reflective screen, making it hard to read unless it is angled just right in relation to the light sources.

This edition offers the possibility to highlight, quote or underline the text you are reading. Moreover, it comes with features such as Music player via a jack.

Specifications
 Size: 175.3 × 121.9 × 10.2mm (6.9" × 4.8" × 0.4")
 Weight: 286 g (10.1 oz)
 Display: 6 inch. touch-screen
 Resolution: 600 × 800 pixels
 Document Search Capability
 Built-in Dictionary: American Oxford and English Oxford
 eBook support extension
 DRM Text : ePub (Adobe DRM protected), PDF (Adobe DRM protected), BBeB Book (PRS DRM protected)
 Unsecured Text : ePub, BBeB Book, PDF5, TXT, RTF, Microsoft Word (Conversion to the Reader requires Word installed on your PC)
 Gray scale: 8-levels gray scale
 Internal Memory: 512MB, 380MB accessible
 Expanded Memory: Support for Sony Memory Stick Pro DUO and SDHC up to @16 Gb
 Font Size: 5 adjustable font sizes
 Battery: Sealed internal, up to two weeks of reading on a single charge
 MSRP: US$170
 Available case colors:
 PRS-600BC: Black
 PRS-600SC: Silver
 PRS-600RC: Red

Daily Edition PRS-900

The PRS-900 was launched in December 2009 and it is also known as the "Daily Edition". The PRS-900 was announced at the same time as the touch-screen PRS-300. It is Sony's Top of the Range device and it priced at US$399. The device has a larger display (7"), 16-levels of grayscale, touch screen and 3G wireless access (through AT&T Mobility in a manner similar to the Kindle's whispernet) which enables computer-free access to the Sony eBookstore in the United States. Like earlier Sony Readers the display can be oriented horizontally, enabling a landscape style mode, and adds a new mode displaying two portrait-mode pages side-by-side (in a similar fashion to viewing a book).

Specifications
 Size: 206.4 × 127 × 15.1 mm (8.1" × 5" × 0.6")
 Weight: 360 g (12.75 oz)
 Display: 7.1 inch touch-screen
 Resolution: 600 × 1024 pixels
 Gray scale: 16-levels gray scale
 Internal Memory: 2 GiB, 1.6 GiB accessible
 Expanded Memory: support for Sony Memory Stick Pro DUO and SDHC up to 32 GiB. According to Sony, it can take up to a 32 GiB Memory Stick.  But, according to its manual, 32 GiB memory sticks are not guaranteed to work.  Therefore, it is recommended to use 16 GiB memory sticks.
 Font Size: 6 adjustable font sizes
 Battery: user replaceable, up to two weeks of reading on a single charge
 Wireless: AT&T 3G wireless (free), access to eBook store only, no Web browser
 MSRP: US$250
 Available case colors: PRS-900: black

2008 Model (Discontinued late 2009)

PRS-700

The PRS-700 was launched in October 2008, it has a touchscreen that can be used as a virtual keyboard. It became available in the U.S. in November 2008 at a MSRP of $399; in April 2009 it was selling for $349.99. Unlike Sony's LIBRIé, a close cousin of the Sony Reader, the PRS-500 and PRS-505 offered no way for the user to annotate a digital book since those lack a keyboard. This was addressed by the release of the PRS-700. Improvements of PRS-700 vs. the PRS-505 include the following:
 The 6-inch E Ink display (same resolution as before) is now a touch screen, removing the need for the 10 side buttons.
 Note taking and virtual keyboard, made possible by the touch screen.
 Page turning buttons remain but can also be accomplished by touch screen gestures.
 LED lighting for use in poor lighting conditions.
 Internal storage is doubled to 512 MB.

PRS-700 specifications
 Size: Approx. 174.3 × 127.6 × 9.7 mm (6" × 5" × 0.4")
 Weight: 283.5 g (10 oz)
 Display:
 size: 15.5 cm (6 in) diagonal (approx 1/4 area of letter-sized page)
 resolution: 170 dpi, 8-level gray scale
 integrated touchscreen
 Memory: 512 MB standard (350 eBooks at 1.2 MB each average, 420 MB available), Sony Memory Stick Pro Duo 8 GB, SDHC card expansion up to 32 GB
 Lithium-ion battery, up to 7500 "page turns" per charge
 PC Interface: USB port 2.0
 Built-in LED reading light

2007 Model (Discontinued late 2009)

PRS-505

The PRS-505 was launched on 2 October 2007, a software and hardware updated version of the PRS-500 Reader, which it replaced. The 505 keeps the 6" E Ink display of the original Reader, but uses an improved version of E Ink Vizplex imaging film with faster refresh time, brighter white state, and 8-level grayscale.

The PRS-505 is thinner than its predecessor (8 mm vs. 13 mm) and comes with more internal memory (256 MiB vs. 64 MiB).

Other new product features included auto-synchronization to a folder on a host PC, support for the USB Mass Storage Device profile, and full USB charging capability (the PRS-500 could only be recharged via USB if the battery was not fully drained, and if the Sony Connect Reader software was installed on the host PC).  Also, adding books to "Collections" (a feature to organize and group book titles) is now possible on the storage card, unlike the PRS-500 model.

Version 1.1 firmware, available as a free download since July 24, 2008 adds support for the EPUB format, Adobe Digital Editions 1.5 and Adobe DRM protected PDF files, automatic reflow of PDF files formatted for larger pages enlarges the text to improve readability, and support for high capacity SDHC memory cards.

Specifications
 Size:  175 × 122 × 8 mm (6.9" × 4.8" × 0.3")
 Weight: 250 g (9 oz)
 Display:
 size: 15.5 cm (6 in) diagonal (approx 1/4 area of letter-sized page)
 resolution: 170 dpi, 8-level gray scale
 portrait: 90.6 × 122.4 mm (3.57" × 4.82"), 600 × 800 pixels | effective 88.2 × 115.4 mm (3.47 × 4.54 in), 584 × 754 pixels | for the Pictures application effective resolution is 600 × 766 pixels
 minimum font size: 6 pt legible, 7 pt recommended
 Memory: 256 MiB standard (200 MiB accessible), Sony Memory Stick Pro Duo 8 GiB, SD card up to 2 GiB (some non-SDHC 4 GiB cards may work), or up to 32 GiB with SDHC cards and version 1.1 firmware
 Lithium-ion battery, up to 6800 "page turns" per charge
 PC interface: USB port 2.0
 Available case colors:
 PRS505/LC: Dark Blue
 PRS505/SC: Silver
 PRS505SC/JP: Custom Skin (James Patterson Special Edition)
 PRS505/RC: Sangria Red (introduced in August 2008)

2006 Model (Discontinued late 2007)

PRS-500
Launched in September 2006, it has a six-inch E Ink display from and is 13 mm thick. There is an internal memory of 64 MiB. This model was superseded by the PRS-505 in 2007.

On November 16, 2009, Sony announced that a firmware update is available to owners of the original PRS-500.  This update "will allow your PRS-500 to support the ePub and Adobe DRM format and add the ability to re-flow PDF documents".  Owners must send the ereader in to the Sony Service Centers for the updated firmware.

Specifications
 Size: 175.6 × 123.6 × 13.8 mm (6.9" × 4.9" × 0.5")
 Weight: 250 g (9 oz)
 Display:
 size: 15.5 cm (6 in) diagonal (approx 1/4 area of letter-sized page)
 resolution: 170 dpi, 4-level gray scale
 portrait: 90.6 × 122.4 mm (3.57" × 4.82"), 600 × 800 px | effective 115.4 × 88.2 mm (4.54 × 3.47 in), 754 × 584 px
 minimum font size: 6 pt legible, 7 pt recommended
 Memory: 64 MiB standard, Memory Stick (Pro Duo High Speed not supported. Normal memory sticks are only supported up to 4 GiB, despite Sony compatibility claims) or SD card expansion up to 2 GiB (some non-SDHC 4 GiB cards may work)
 Lithium-ion battery, up to 7500 "page turns" per charge
 PC interface: USB port

2004 Model

Sony Librie EBR-1000EP
Launched in April 2004, it has a six-inch E Ink display and a Qwerty keyboard that was released in Japan.

Specifications
 Display: 6-inch screen with a resolution of 600x800 dots at 170dpi
 10 MB, Memory Stick support
 Size  126mm x 190mm x 13mm 
 Weight: 300 g

Formats supported
DRM-free Text: BBeB Book (LRF), TXT, RTF, EPUB (PRS-T1: EPUB, PDF, TXT only). Typefaces in PDF files formatted for 216 × 280 mm (8.5 × 11 inch) pages may be too small to read comfortably.  Such files can be reformatted for the Reader screen size with Adobe Acrobat Professional, but not by Adobe Reader software.  The Reader does support Microsoft Word DOC format. The 'CONNECT Reader' application uses Word to convert the .DOC files to RTF before sending them to the Reader.

DRM-protected Text: BBeB Book (LRX); ePub.

Audio: MP3 and DRM-free AAC (except on the PRS-T2, PRS-300 & PRS-350)

Image: JPEG, GIF, PNG, and BMP (Loading an animated GIF will freeze the Reader)

RSS: Limited to 20 featured blogs such as Engadget and Wired, no ability to add others and no auto-update (as of 2006-12-01)

The Reader supported TXT and RTF documents with Latin character set only. Other character sets (such as Cyrillic, for example) are not displayed correctly, but Cyrillic patches are available for Russian (and Bulgarian) users. Sony Customer Support have confirmed that units sold in the US only work with Latin characters (as of 2007-03-02).

On August 13, 2009, Sony announced that by the end of 2009, it would only sell EPUB books from the Sony Reader Store, and would have dropped its proprietary DRM entirely in favor of Adobe's CS4 server side copy protection.

Official software

MS Windows
Sony Reader came bundled with Sony's proprietary software called Sony Reader Library (or formerly eBook Library and Sony Connect). It requires MS Windows XP or higher (MS Windows Vista or 7), an 800 MHz processor, 128 MB of RAM, and 20 MB of hard disk space. This software does not work on the 64-bit versions of MS Windows XP. 64-bit MS Windows Vista and 7 is supported since Sony eBook Library version 2.5 for all but the 500 models.

In February 2014 Sony Reader announced that they were transferring content to the Kobo Store. In March 2014 the Sony Reader store was closed and account holders received an email with a link that enabled them to transfer their library to Kobo. Most titles transferred; however, some were not able to be transferred even though the titles were sold on Kobo; the transfer period ended in May.

Apple Mac OS X
Sony released an official Apple Mac OS X client for the Reader with the release of the PRS-300 and PRS-600. It is reported to work with the PRS-505, PRS-700, Reader Pocket Edition and Reader Touch Edition. The software now works under 10.7 Lion.

Linux and other OS 
Sony eBook Library was not officially supported on Linux-based systems or other operating systems, although when the device is connected it grants access to its internal flash memory and any memory card slots as though they were USB Mass Storage devices (on all models except PRS-500s that have not received the free EPUB upgrade from Sony), allowing the user to transfer files directly. See the Third party tools section below for a third-party software utility that provides comprehensive support for MS Windows, Apple Mac OS X, and Linux. Note if the device is locked, using the optional 4 digit pin it will not mount via USB, the lock option needs to be disabled in order to mount the device.

Third party tools
Several third-party tools exist for the Sony Reader. For example, the PRS Browser for Apple Mac OS X from Docudesk allows Apple Macintosh users to manage content on the Sony Reader. Users can also use the free software library and utility called Calibre to communicate with the Reader and manage their digital library. Calibre can convert many ebook formats as well as collate multiple HTML pages into a single ebook file with an automatically generated table of contents. Calibre can also manage RSS subscriptions, including scheduled pushes of newsfeeds to the reader. It has both a command line and graphical interface, and is available for MS Windows, Apple Mac OS X and Linux.  Calibre notably does not offer MS Windows 64-bit support for the PRS-500 model either.

Specialized on notes, annotations, bookmarks and other input by the user, noteworks allows for listing, exporting and other handling of this data, extracted from the device.

In addition, Adobe Digital Editions can deliver DRM-locked PDF and ePub documents to the PRS-350, PRS-505 and PRS-700. The software is officially available for Windows and Mac OS. It can be run on Linux using Wine.  After activating the reader on an officially supported platform, DRM-locked media can be downloaded and transferred to the reader on Linux as well.

Alternative firmware

PRS+
PRS+ project seamlessly integrates into Sony UI and adds support for folder browsing, dictionary, key binding, book history, custom epub styles, games (Sudoku, Chess, Mahjong, etc.), localization (Catalan, German, Czech, English, French, Georgian, Russian, Spanish, and Simplified Chinese) and has built in fb2 to EPUB converter.

Ebook applications
Runs as an independent application. Adds support for FB2 / CBR / CBZ formats, drops support for LRF. Currently in beta state.

Internal OS

The PRS-T1, PRS-T2 and PRS-T3 run a heavily modified version of the Android operating system, which Sony mentions in the Legal Notices installed on the device. Its predecessors run the MontaVista Linux Professional Edition operating system with Kinoma FSK, a JavaScript virtual machine, optimized for devices with limited resources.

Sales 
In December 2008, Sony disclosed that it had sold 300,000 units of its Reader Digital Book globally since the device launched in October 2006. According to an IDC study from March 2011, sales for all e-book readers worldwide grew to 12.8 million in 2010; 800,000 of those were Sony Readers.

See also
 Comparison of e-book readers
 Amazon Kindle
 Barnes & Noble Nook
 Calibrean open source third party software to manage digital library with support of conversion between common e-book formats. Created originally for Sony e-readers, it supports over 30 different brands and types of readers.
 Kobo eReader
 OverDrive, Inc.ebook borrowing services for public libraries
 Tablet computer

References

External links

 .
 SONY Digital Reader
 .

Sony products
Dedicated ebook devices
Electronic paper technology
Linux-based devices